Chirgus barrosi is a species of butterfly of the family of Hesperiidae, first described in 1956 by Emilio Ureta. It is known from Chile, where it is found at high altitudes in sandy locations with leguminous plants. 

The species was previously placed in genus Pyrgus, but was, alongside several other species formerly in Pyrgus, transferred to newly-erected genus Chirgus in 2019.

References

Pyrginae
Hesperiidae of South America
Butterflies described in 1956
Endemic fauna of Chile